But for the Grace of God is a play by the British writer Frederick Lonsdale. A murder melodrama, different from his standard light comedies, it ran for 203 performances at St James's Theatre in the West End between 3 September 1946 and 1 March 1947. The original cast included Michael Gough, A.E. Matthews, Mary Jerrold and Yvonne Owen.

Original cast
Alfred - Andrew Leigh
Gerard - Michael Gough
Sir William Altrey - Stuart Lindsell
Johnny - Anthony Forwood
George Duncan - H.G. Stoker
Jimmy - Denis Gordon
Charles - A.E. Matthews
Geoffrey Wainwright - Hugh McDermott
Inspector Rayle - J.H. Roberts
Detective Orley - Cyril Smith
Richard - Robert Douglas
Molly - Marion Manisty
Emily - Mary Jerrold
Mary - Yvonne Owen

References

Bibliography
 Wearing, J.P. The London Stage 1940-1949: A Calendar of Productions, Performers, and Personnel.  Rowman & Littlefield, 2014.

Plays by Frederick Lonsdale
1946 plays
West End plays